Namara is a surname. Notable people with the surname include:

 Marguerite Namara (1888–1974), American actress and singer
 Stephen Namara (born 1953),  American artist

See also 

 Namara inscription
 MacNamara